Hovik Keuchkerian (born 14 November 1972) is a Spanish actor and former boxer best known for the role of Bogotá in 
Money Heist.

Biography 
Born in Beirut, Lebanon to an ethnic Armenian father and a Spanish mother, he moved with his family to Spain at age three, and he was raised in Alpedrete.

Keuchkerian is a former boxer.  He became a boxer and was Spanish Heavyweight Champion twice. After quitting boxing, he started a new career as a stand-up comedian and writer (he has published four books), the last of them entitled Resiliente. His performance playing a boxing trainer in the 2013 film Scorpion in Love earned him a nomination to the Goya Award for Best New Actor.

Selected filmography
 Hispania, la leyenda (2011)
 Scorpion in Love (2013)
 Isabel (2013)
 El ministerio del tiempo (2015)
 The Night Manager (2015)
 Assassin's Creed (2016)
 Snatch (2017)
 The Man Who Killed Don Quixote (2018)
 4 Latas (2019)
 Money Heist (2019–2021)
 Riot Police (2020)
 The Head  (2022)

Awards and nominations
In his career Keuchkerian has won three awards out of a total of 5 nominations obtained.

References

External links 

1972 births
Living people
Spanish male boxers
Spanish male film actors
Spanish people of Lebanese descent
Lebanese people of Armenian descent
Ethnic Armenian actors
Lebanese male television actors
21st-century Spanish male actors
Spanish male television actors
Male actors from Beirut
Sportspeople from Beirut